Dominican College Portstewart is a grammar school in Portstewart, County Londonderry, Northern Ireland. It is situated on a cliff overlooking the Atlantic Ocean with views over Portstewart's promenade, the northern coastline of Northern Ireland and the County Donegal hills in the Republic of Ireland.

History
Rock Castle was originally built by Henry O'Hara in 1834. The castle was extended in 1844 and then passed to the Crombie family before being sold to the Dominican Sisters in 1917. The Dominican College "is concerned not merely with imparting knowledge and skills, which have their place, but, more importantly with training pupils to think, to evaluate and to make decisions."

Academics
In 2018, 93.8% of its entrants achieved five or more GCSEs at grades A* to C, including the core subjects English and Maths.  Also in 2018, 57.4% of its entrants to the A-level exam achieved A*-C grades.

Notable former pupils

Cathal Smyth / Chas Smash (born 1959) - Musician, Singer Songwriter in Madness
Jimeoin McKeown (born 1966) - Comedian
Sarah Travers (born 1974) - BBC journalist
Tony Wright (born 1982) - Musician, Singer Songwriter known as VerseChorusVerse

See also
 Dominicans in Ireland

References

External links
School website

Grammar schools in County Londonderry
Dominican schools in the United Kingdom
Catholic secondary schools in Northern Ireland
Educational institutions established in 1917
1917 establishments in Ireland
Portstewart